Hardcore Pawn: Chicago is an American reality television series on truTV. A spin-off of Hardcore Pawn, the series follows the day-to-day operations of the Royal Pawn Shop located in Chicago, Illinois, at 428 S. Clark Street across from the Metropolitan Correctional Center near Chicago's Financial District.

On August 15, 2012, truTV ordered 18 half-hour episodes for the first season which first premiered on January 1, 2013. In January 2014, truTV announced that the show had been canceled.

In 2014, the location was used on the television show, Chicago PD, with actor Elias Koteas entering the shop to ask a pawnbroker about a case.

Cast
Randy Cohen ‒ owner
Wayne Cohen ‒ owner
Elyse Cohen ‒ Randy Cohen's daughter, co-owner
Nate Cohen ‒ Wayne Cohen's son, co-owner
Hymie "Hy" Mischoulam ‒ store manager
Carl "Carlos" Deals ‒ security
Lee Rogers ‒ head of security, fur expert, known as "Rogers"
Jeremy Jackson ‒ employee

Episodes
A total of 18 episodes were broadcast.

References

External links

Hardcore Pawn: Chicago on TV.com
Royal Pawn Shop website

2010s American reality television series
2013 American television series debuts
2013 American television series endings
Television shows set in Chicago
English-language television shows
Reality television spin-offs
TruTV original programming
Pawn shops
American television spin-offs